Tapesia yallundae is the causal agent for a variety of cereal and forage grass diseases.  The anamorph of T. yallundae is the W-type strain of Pseudocercosporella herpotrichoides.  The R-type strain of Pseudocercosporella herpotrichoides is now known as Tapesia acuformis.

Morphology

Produces two types of mycelium - one vegetative, yellow-brown, linear, and branching, the other dark and stromalike.  Conidiophores are simple or sparingly branched.  Conidia (1.5-3.5 x 37-70 μm) are hyaline, curved, and mostly five- to seven-celled.  Sclerotia or sclerotialike stromatic mycelium, at first white to yellow-brown but later dark brown, may also be found on the lesions of infected plants.

Black apothecia, 0.2 to 0.5 mm of diameter, form at the base of host culms. Apothecium contain  cylindric to fusoid asci, of 35 to 38 µm x 5.9 to 7.4 µm.  Ascospores are hyaline, fusoid, 0-1 septate, with a rounded end and an average size of 8.9 µm (7.4 to 10.3) x 2.07 µm (1.95 to 2.34).

Growth media

Tapesia yallundae can be grown on a moist, sterile wheat and barley straw, oat kernels, and a variety of simple agar media, preferably supplemented with wheat extract. Sporulation in vitro tends to originate from loose sporodochai. Young colonies on potato-dextrose agar are gray, compact and mounded.

Molecular characterization

Polymerase chain reaction (PCR) combined with restriction enzyme digestion of an amplified ribosomal DNA fragment, are now used to characterize T. yallundae isolates.  Novartis produces a polymerase chain reaction (PCR) diagnostic tool that provides cereal growers with an efficient means for checking the progression of eyespot disease in cereals. The tool reveals the presence and extent of disease before symptoms develop and can identify the different eyespot strains including the W-type (Tapesia yallundae''') and R-type (Tapesia acuformis).

Host speciesAegilops cylindrica1,, Aegilops ovata1,, Aegilops sp.1,, Aegilops triuncialis1,, Agropyron cristatum1,, Agropyron dasystachyum1,, Agropyron inerme1,, Agropyron repens1,, Agropyron riparium1,, Agropyron sp.1,, Avena fatua1,, Avena sativa1,, Avena sp.1,, Balsamorhiza sp.1,, Bromus carinatus1,, Bromus inermis1,, Bromus japonicus1,, Bromus sterilis1,, Bromus tectorum1,, Delphinium sp1,., Festuca idahoensis1,, Hordeum distichon1,, Hordeum vulgare1,, Koeleria cristata1,, Lithospermum ruderale1,, Lomatium triternatum1,, Poa sandbergii1,, Poa secunda, Secale cereale, Sitanion hystrix1,, Trisetum aestivum1,, Triticum aestivum1,, Triticum dicoccum1,, Triticum durum1,, Triticum monococcum1,, Triticum sp.1,, Triticum spelta1,, Triticum vulgare''1,

Notes

1. USDA ARS Fungal Database

Main diseases

Eyespot of wheat; eyespot of barley; eyespot of rye.

Geographical distribution

Notes

1. USDA ARS Fungal Database
2. 
3. 
4. 
5.

Sources 
 Index Fungorum
 USDA ARS Fungal Database

References 

Fungal plant pathogens and diseases
Barley diseases
Wheat diseases
Dermateaceae